Ian Michael Glynn FRS FRCP (3 June 1928 – 7 July 2022) was a British biologist and a Fellow of the Royal Society.

He was Professor of Physiology, University of Cambridge, 1986–95, and was later professor emeritus.  He has been a Fellow, Trinity College, Cambridge since 1955 (Vice-Master, 1980–86).

Education: City of London School; Trinity College, Cambridge; University College, London Hospital.

His work on the 'sodium pump' led to his election to the Royal Society and to Honorary Foreign Membership of the American Academy of Arts and Sciences. Glynn was the author of An Anatomy of Thought: The Origin and Machinery of the Mind (2003) and Elegance in Science: The beauty of simplicity  (2010).

Glynn died on 7 July 2022, at the age of 94.

References

1928 births
2022 deaths
Fellows of the Royal Society
British Jews
Jewish scientists
Fellows of Trinity College, Cambridge
Fellows of the Royal College of Physicians
Alumni of Trinity College, Cambridge
Alumni of University College London
20th-century British biologists
21st-century British biologists
British physiologists
The Journal of Physiology editors
Professors of Physiology (Cambridge)